Jonathan Golden Kimball (June 9, 1853 – September 2, 1938) was a leader of the Church of Jesus Christ of Latter-day Saints (LDS Church), serving as a member of the First Council of the Seventy from 1892 until his death in 1938.  He is considered one of the most colorful and beloved of the church's general authorities.  In the years since his death, "Uncle Golden" has become a near legendary character among church members, possibly comparable to what Will Rogers or Mark Twain are to the general American public.

Early life 
Kimball was born in Salt Lake City, Utah Territory, the son of apostle Heber C. Kimball and Christeene Golden Kimball.  He was one of sixty-five children fathered by Heber C. Kimball, a practitioner of the early LDS doctrine of plural marriage. Kimball was one of the first generation of Latter-day Saints to be born after the Mormon pioneers' exodus to Utah in 1847, and was familiar with the pioneer experience and the expansion of Latter-day Saint settlements in the Intermountain Region.

Kimball was the oldest of his mother's three children and was fifteen when his father died.  To support the family, he left school and became a mule driver.  His mother kept boarders as well as sewing for Zion's Co-operative Mercantile Institution or ZCMI, one of the first department stores in the United States.  In 1876, he and his brother, Elias, established a horse and cattle ranch in Meadowville, Rich County, and moved there with their immediate family. He cut timber during the winter for use in the construction of the church's Logan Utah Temple and also worked as superintendent of a lumber mill.  After hearing an 1881 speech by educator Karl G. Maeser, the Kimball brothers decided to leave their ranch and return to school. They attended Brigham Young Academy in Provo, receiving certificates in Bookkeeping and Commercial Arithmetic (commercial program diplomas) in June 1881.

Service as a missionary 
After completing his education, Kimball was called as a missionary to the southern United States on April 6, 1883, by LDS Church president John Taylor.  Kimball remembered that he:

... left Chattanooga, Tennessee, with twenty-seven elders assigned to the Southern States. There were all kinds of elders in the company—farmers, cowboys, few educated—a pretty hard-looking crowd, and I was one of that kind. The elders preached, and talked, and sang, and advertised loudly their calling as preachers. I kept still for once in my life; I hardly opened my mouth. I saw a gentleman on the train. I can visualize that man now. I didn't know who he was. He knew we were a band of Mormon elders. The elders soon commenced a discussion and argument with the stranger, and before he got through they were in grave doubt about their message of salvation. He gave them a training that they never forgot. That man proved to be (LDS Mission) President B. H. Roberts.

For the first year of his mission Kimball served in Virginia.

Kimball served in a time of great persecution and some violence in the South.  He was serving in the mission office in Chattanooga, as mission secretary, when three LDS elders were killed by a mob as they held services on Sunday, August 10, 1884.  Although he developed a case of malaria, which troubled him for many years, Kimball remained active in the mission until his release in the spring of 1885.

Kimball returned to ranching in the Bear Lake Valley and married Jennie Knowlton, a daughter of John Q. and Ellen Smith Knowlton.  The couple had six children, three boys and three girls.  While living in the Bear Lake area, Kimball served as a home missionary, somewhat like modern ward missionaries. Shortly later, Kimball was made the head of the Young Men's Mutual Improvement Association for the Bear Lake Stake (which included the far South-east corner of Idaho, as well as some of Rich County, Utah).  A short time later, Kimball, along with his brothers, Newel and Elias, set up a business called Kimball Brothers with branches in Montpelier, Idaho and Logan, Utah and at this time Kimball moved to Logan.

In 1891, he was called to return as president of the Southern States Mission. In a conference address in 1927, he summarized his experiences in the southern states:

Service as a Seventy
In 1892, while still serving as mission president, Kimball was called to be a general authority and member of the First Council of Seventy.  He humorously attributed his new position to his father's influence:

Kimball served as a general authority for forty-six years.  During the time, it was customary for church leaders to frequently travel to Mormon communities in the western territories and states.  Kimball gave hundreds of sermons, sparkling with humor and wit.  A tall lean man, his voice was described as high and rasping.  He was well known for swearing good naturedly from the pulpit, sprinkling "damns" and "hells" into his speeches.  Although the habit was of concern to other church leaders, and subjected him to counsel from church president Heber J. Grant on many occasions, this common touch made Kimball one of the most beloved leaders in the church's history. Asked how he could get away with the way he spoke, Kimball is said to have replied: Hell, they can't excommunicate me. I repent too damned fast.

This "folksy" style was backed by intelligence and deep spirituality, and Latter-day Saints would travel long distances to hear him speak at conferences.

"J. Golden" stories have become a type of folklore for members of the LDS Church.  One of the best known has LDS Church president Grant writing a "clean" radio speech for Kimball and ordering him to read it. However, once on the air, Kimball struggled with Grant's handwriting and finally exclaimed, Hell, Heber, I can't read this damn thing.  Most of these stories are apocryphal.

Following the death of B. H. Roberts in 1933, Kimball became the senior President of the Seventy. He was buried at Salt Lake City Cemetery.

See also
Mormon folklore

Notes

References
 Cheney, Thomas E. The Golden Legacy: A Folk History of J. Golden Kimball. Peregrine Smith, 1974, 1979. .
 Kimball, James.  J. Golden Kimball Stories. White Horse Books, 1999.  .
 Richards, Claude. J. Golden Kimball: The Story of a Unique Personality.  Deseret News Press, Salt Lake City, Utah, 1932, republished in 2011 by Literary Licensing, LLC.  .
 Fife, Austin and Fife, Alta. Saints of Sage & Saddle. (1956).
 Kimball, Jonathan Golden.  J. Golden Kimball: His Sermons.  Latter-day Publishing, 2008. .

External links

1853 births
1938 deaths
19th-century Mormon missionaries
American Mormon missionaries in the United States
American general authorities (LDS Church)
Brigham Young Academy alumni
Burials at Salt Lake City Cemetery
Latter Day Saints from Utah
Mission presidents (LDS Church)
Mormon folklore
People from Salt Lake City
Presidents of the Seventy (LDS Church)
Road incident deaths in Nevada